His People (also known as Proud Heart) is a 1925 American silent drama film directed by Edward Sloman about a young, Jewish boxer growing up on the Lower East Side of Manhattan. According to film historian Lester Friedman, “Sloman portrays immigrant life in America.”

Cast

Score
In 2004, Paul Shapiro wrote  a score for the film.

In 2007 Peter Rothbart, a professor of music at Ithaca College wrote a score for the film.

Preservation
A print of His People is preserved at the Library of Congress.

References

External links

National Center for Jewish Film: His People
Review of film at Variety

1925 films
American silent feature films
Films about Jews and Judaism
1925 drama films
Universal Pictures films
American black-and-white films
Silent American drama films
Films directed by Edward Sloman
1920s American films